Dibamus greeri, also known commonly as Greer's blind skink, is a species of legless lizard in the family Dibamidae. The species is endemic to Vietnam.

Etymology
The specific name, greeri, is in honor of Australian herpetologist Allen Eddy Greer.

Ecology and reproduction
D. greeri is a fossorial species occurring in both primary and secondary forest. It is oviparous.

References

Further reading
Darevsky I (1992). "Two New Species of the Worm-Like Lizard Dibamus (Sauria: Dibamidae), with Remarks on the Distribution and Ecology of Dibamus in Vietnam". Asiatic Herpetological Research 4: 1–12. (Dibamus greeri, new species, pp. 5–8, Figures 6, 7A, 7B, 8, 11C + Plate 1).
Nguyen, Van Sang; Ho, Thu Cuc; Nguyen, Quang Truong (2009). Herpetofauna of Vietnam. Frankfurt am Main: Edition Chimaira / Serpents Tale. 768 pp. .

Dibamus
Reptiles of Vietnam
Endemic fauna of Vietnam
Reptiles described in 1992
Taxa named by Ilya Darevsky